Halse may refer to:

Placenames
 Halse, Northamptonshire, a hamlet near Brackley, Northamptonshire, England
 Halse, Norway, in Vest-Agder county
 Halse, Somerset, is a village near Taunton in Somerset, England

Other uses
Halse (name)
Halse Hall, Plantation great house in Clarendon, Jamaica - the oldest English building in Jamaica which is still used as a residence

See also
Woodford Halse, a large village in Northamptonshire, England